Tourism Improvement Districts (TIDs) are a type of business improvement district in the United States. The aim of TIDs is increasing the number of overnight visitors using business and services in that area. TIDs are formed through a public–private partnership between the local government and the businesses in a district. TID funds are usually managed by a nonprofit corporation, generally a Convention and Visitors' Bureau, hotel association, or similar destination marketing organization. Typical TID services include marketing programs to raise awareness of the destination, sponsorship of special events that attract overnight visitors, and sales programs to bring in large-group business. Synonymous terms for TIDs include: tourism marketing district, hotel improvement district, and tourism business improvement district.

Tourism Improvement Districts by US States

California
In California, tourism improvement districts are formed under the Property and Business Improvement District Law of 1994, the Parking and Business Improvement Area Law of 1989, or a similar enabling ordinance adopted by a charter city. California districts are also subject to other laws designed to ensure approval by business owners paying the assessment and accountability by the managing body to those business owners.

Tourism improvement districts are formed with a majority of assessed businesses consenting and the local government's approval. Funds raised are returned to a non-profit corporation which is under contract with the local government to manage those funds. Several accountability mechanisms ensure that funds are spent in accordance with a specifically defined district plan that includes marketing and sales programs approved by the businesses paying into the district. The two main reasons for TIDs' growing popularity among tourism-related businesses are:

 Funds cannot be spent on programs that don't benefit the businesses paying the assessment
 Funds cannot be diverted by the government for other programs

As of November 2010, there were 54 known local tourism improvement districts in California, including:
San Diego Tourism Marketing District 
Napa Valley Tourism Improvement District 
Sacramento County Tourism Improvement District 
Marin County Tourism Improvement District 
South Lake Tahoe Tourism Business Improvement District 
San Jose Hotel Business Improvement Area 
Santa Barbara South Coast Tourism Business Improvement District 
Long Beach Tourism Business Improvement Area
Del Mar Tourism Business Improvement District 
Newport Beach Tourism Improvement District
Monterey County Tourism Improvement District 
Mendocino County Lodging Business Improvement District 
Oceanside Tourism Marketing District

Most districts encompass either a city or county, although some include multiple cities or a county and the cities within it. California's first tourism improvement district was formed in West Hollywood in 1992. The recent tourism improvement district was formed in Santa Barbara in September, 2010. California's tourism improvement districts range from small 5-hotel community districts to major cities with several hundred hotels and its budget ranges from $100,000 to over $30 million.

One of California's most noticeable tourism improvement districts is the San Diego Tourism Marketing District. The district funded the hugely popular “Happy Happens” advertising campaign. The San Diego Tourism Marketing District funds many programs and events designed to bring overnight visitors to San Diego, including Comic Con and the Holiday Bowl.

A lawsuit filed in 2012 by San Diegans for Open Government challenges the renewal of the San Diego Tourism Marketing District. The lawsuit filed by Cory Briggs, a public interest lawyer, claims that the assessment is basically a tax and therefore is not valid under California proposition 26 which requires a two-thirds supermajority to pass any tax. In January 2016 the judge sided with San Diegans for Open Government that the nonprofit has legal standing to pursue the case. The case now moves on to be argued on the merits of the lawsuit.

Montana
In Montana, upon a petition by owners of 60% of the businesses in the district, a municipality may begin the district formation process by adopting a resolution of intention. There is a 15-day period in which owners may protest formation of the district, and the municipality must hold public hearings on the proposed district. A 5-7 member board of trustees is appointed to manage the district.

Nevada
In 2005, Nevada passed a tourism improvement district law. Under the law, the governing body of a municipality may create a tourism improvement district for the purposes of carrying out the law and without any election can acquire, improve, equip, operate and maintain a project within such district. Proceeds from certain state and local sales tax generated within the district can be used to finance the project.

Washington State
Washington's Tourism Promotion Areas Law requires submission of petitions from business owners who will pay 60% or more of the proposed assessment. Only lodging businesses with forty or more units can be included in the tourism promotion area. Upon receipt of petitions, the municipality must adopt a resolution of intention and hold public hearings on the proposed promotion area. An advisory board or commission may be appointed, or a destination marketing organization may be designated to manage the district funds.

References

External links
Cities Market Themselves Through Tourism Business Improvement Districts - Informational news article.
Business Improvement Districts: Reshaping the Tourism Landscape: Strategy Implications for Your Destination - Information on how tourism improvement districts are affecting destination marketing programs in areas with and without tourism districts.
San Diego Tourism Marketing District - Home page of the San Diego Tourism Marketing District, includes information on operations and programs.
Napa Valley Tourism Improvement District - Official county information on the Napa Valley Tourism Improvement District.

Business improvement districts
Tourism